Patriarch Meletius I may refer to:

 Meletius of Antioch, Patriarch in 361–381
 Meletius I Pegas,  Greek Patriarch of Alexandria in 1590–1601